Lotsee is a town in Tulsa County, Oklahoma, United States. The population was 6 at the 2020 census, compared to a total of 2 in 2010. It is the smallest incorporated municipality in Oklahoma.

The entire town is a  family-owned cattle and pecan ranch, the Flying G Ranch, whose owner, George Campbell, incorporated it in 1963. The population peaked at 16 in 1970, then declined to seven in 1980.

Geography
Lotsee is located at  (36.133434, -96.209454).

According to the United States Census Bureau, the town has a total area of 0.02 square mile (0.1 km2), all land.

Demographics

In 2010, the only residents were Lotsee Spradling, daughter of the founder, and her husband Mike. They have no plans to dissolve the town.

As of the census of 2000, there were 11 people, 3 households, and 3 families residing in the town. There were 3 housing units at an average density of 157.1 per square mile (57.9/km2). The racial makeup of the town was 27.27% White and 72.73% Native American.

There were 3 households, out of which 33.3% had children under the age of 18 living with them, all were married couples living together, and none were non-families. No households were made up of individuals, and none had someone living alone who was 65 years of age or older. The average household size was 3.67 and the average family size was 3.67.

In the town, the population was spread out, with 27.3% under the age of 18, 36.4% from 25 to 44, and 36.4% from 45 to 64. The median age was 32 years. For every 100 females, there were 83.3 males. For every 100 females age 18 and over, there were 100.0 males.

The median income for a household in the town was $152,338, and the median income for a family was $152,338. Males had a median income of $11,250 versus $51,875 for females. The per capita income for the town was $41,917. None of the population and none of the families were below the poverty line.

References

External links
 Fact Sheet, Lotsee town, Oklahoma. (accessed February 9, 2007)
 Census Place Map 3, Tulsa County, Oklahoma. (accessed February 9, 2007)

Towns in Oklahoma
Towns in Tulsa County, Oklahoma